National Highway 218, commonly referred to as NH 218 is a national highway in India. It is a secondary route of National Highway 18.  NH-218 runs in the states of West Bengal and Jharkhand in India.

Route 
NH218 connects Purulia, Chandakyari, Jhariya and Dhanbad in the states of West Bengal and Jharkhand.
Butween chandankiyari and puruliya
A small village nowdiha who grow as a town

Junctions  
 
  Terminal near Purulia.
  Terminal near Dhanbad.

See also 
 List of National Highways in India
 List of National Highways in India by state

References

External links 
 NH 218 on OpenStreetMap

National highways in India
National Highways in Jharkhand
National Highways in West Bengal